Ashwaradham is a 1980 Indian Malayalam film,  directed by I. V. Sasi and produced by Pavamani. The film stars Srividya, Raveendran (actor), Prameela and Balan K. Nair in the lead roles. The film has musical score by Shyam.

Cast
Srividya as Jayanthy Shankar
Raveendran (actor) as Ramootti
Prameela as Sreedevi Kunjamma
Balan K. Nair as Veeraraghan
Janardanan as Rajagopal
K. P. Ummer as Shankar
Bahadoor as Menon
T. P. Madhavan as James
Kuthiravattam Pappu as Velayyan
K. P. A. C. Azeez as Kuttan
Kuttyedathi Vilasini
Nithya as Shanty
Ravikumar as Gopi

Soundtrack
The music was composed by Shyam and the lyrics were written by Mankombu Gopalakrishnan.

References

External links
 

1980 films
1980s Malayalam-language films
Films directed by I. V. Sasi